Amata polymita, the tiger-striped clearwing moth, is a moth of the family Erebidae. The species was first described by Carl Linnaeus in 1768. It is found in China and Vietnam.

The wingspan is about 35 mm.

The larvae feed on Breynia fruticosa and Gyaura crepidioidea.

References

External links

"Tiger-Striped Clearwing Moth (Arctiidae Ctenuchinae Amata polymita - Sparrman)". The Shepherd's Truth. (October 16, 1999). Archived from the original October 7, 2011.

polymita
Moths described in 1768
Moths of Asia
Taxa named by Carl Linnaeus